Streetheart is an album by the American singer/songwriter Dion, released in 1976 on Warner Bros. Records. It was a commercial failure.

Critical reception
Salon deemed the album "unshaped and undistinguished." AllMusic wrote that the album proved that Dion "still knew how to straddle his present and his past comfortably and effectively."

Track listing

Side 1
"The Way You Do the Things You Do" (William "Smokey" Robinson, Robert Rogers) – 3:50
"Runaway Man" (Stormie Omartian, Michael Omartian) – 3:04
"Queen of ‘59" (Dion DiMucci, Bill Tuohy) – 3:28
"If I Can Just Get Through Tonight" (Peter Anders) – 3:28
"More to You (Than Meets the Eye)" (Dion DiMucci, Danny Grenier) – 2:57
"You Showed Me What Love Is" (Ben Raleigh, Sam Fox) – 3:09

Side 2
"Hey My Love" (Mark Radice) – 3:20
"Oh the Night" (Dion DiMucci) – 4:34
"I’ll Give You All I’ve Got" (Thomas Cain) – 3:23
"Lover Boy Supreme" (Dion DiMucci, Tony Fasce) – 3:31
"Streetheart" (Dion DiMucci) – 5:23

Personnel
Dion DiMucci - vocals, guitar
Michael Omartian - keyboards, arrangements, conductor
Lee Sklar - bass
David Kemper - drums
Dean Parks - guitar
Victor Feldman, Gary Coleman, Steve Barri - percussion
Ben Benay - guitar, harmonica
Chuck Findley, Steve Madaio - trumpet
Nino Tempo, Ernie Watts, Steve Douglas - woodwind
Dick Hyde - trombone
Nino Tempo - tenor saxophone solos
Sid Sharp - string section concertmaster
Backing vocals
Phil Everly - harmony on "Queen of ‘59"
Oren Waters, Luther Waters - backing vocals on "You Showed Me What Love Is" and "The Way You Do the Things You Do"
Stormie Omartian, Carolyn Willis, Ann White, Myrna Matthews - backing vocals on "More to You" and "Lover Boy Supreme"
Jim Haas, Kerry Chater, Michael Omartian, Phil Everly - backing vocals
Production
Basic rhythm tracks recorded at Sound Labs, Inc,
Tommy Vicari - engineer
Vocals, strings & horns mixed at ABC Recording Studios Inc.
Phil Kaye - engineer
Roger Nichols - assistant engineer
Sam Emerson - photography

References

1976 albums
Dion DiMucci albums
Albums produced by Michael Omartian
Warner Records albums